Frederick J. Schlink (October 26, 1891 – January 15, 1995) was an American consumer rights activist. He co-wrote the book 100,000,000 Guinea Pigs with Arthur Kallet, and co-founded the watchdog group 
Consumers' Research.

Life and activism
Schlink was born in Peoria, Illinois, and graduated from the University of Illinois in 1912.  In 1914, he acquired the degree of Mechanical Engineer, and worked at the United States Bureau of Standards until 1919.  After work in quality control for Firestone Tire and Rubber Company, and for the Bell Telephone Laboratories, he became an assistant secretary for the non-profit American Standards Association.

In 1927, Schlink was co-author, with Stuart Chase, of the bestseller, Your Money's Worth, a warning about sales pressure and misleading advertising. The book called attention to the "Consumers' Club", a small organization in White Plains, New York. Within two years, the club had members nationwide and was incorporated as Consumers' Research.  Arthur Kallet, the secretary of the group, enlisted Schlink's aid as co-author of One Hundred Million Guinea Pigs in 1933. (The title referred to what was roughly the population of the United States at the time.) The book caused a stir, noting that some well-advertised products (including mouthwash and hair dyes) were sometimes useless and even dangerous. In 1934, he published a pamphlet with his wife, Mary Catherine Phillips, Discovering Consumers. His final book was Eat, Drink and be Wary in 1935. Schlink himself lived for sixty years after the book's publication and died at the age of 103.

Consumers' Research
Schlink was instrumental in moving Consumers' Research to Washington, New Jersey and then the Bowerstown section of Washington Township, New Jersey. When employees demanded more wages, he refused.  Three went on strike with outside union help, and were terminated.  Forty more employees then struck as support for those terminated.  Schlink had always been focused upon capitalistic advertising, and he saw this an "unholy alliance" with the strikers, and he used force to break the strike.  This act was one that started the exodus of former CR employees to their own organization, the new Consumers Union, which began publishing its own magazine, Consumers Union Reports, in direct competition to Schlink's Consumers' Research Bulletin.  This magazine soon surpassed the Bulletin in circulation, and, renamed Consumer Reports, became and remains the leading North American consumer magazine.

References

External links
 
 
 

Schlink, F. J.
Schlink, F. J.
Schlink, F. J.
Schlink, F. J.
Schlink, F. J.
University of Illinois alumni
Writers from Peoria, Illinois
People from Warren County, New Jersey